FK Ovče Pole is a football club from Sveti Nikole, North Macedonia. They are currently competing in the Macedonian Third League (East Division).

History
The club was founded in 1925 and has established itself as one of the oldest clubs in the Republic of North Macedonia. The club formed him for cared local merchants and craftsmen that the guild town. Football as a game was accepted with great pleasure the local population in the Sveti Nikole Municipality, which as a game for a specific urban environment, through the football game and expressed the culture of living of the population.

At the very beginning it plays naturally created meadows in Suvo pole and others, but as football evolved and became increasingly more organized as the need arose to construct a modern stadium which will provide all conditions for playing football.

The City Stadium was built in 1965 from Sveti Nikole Municipality assisted by local companies, and its construction began a real renaissance of Ovče Pole Sveti Nikole which in the coming years and achieved its greatest successes, and that is playing Macedonian Republic League in the 1970–71 season winning first place in the first part of the championship.

The greater names from that generation are: Panche Kocev, Ratko Milanov, Vane Stoilev, Blagoj Mishev, Lazo Andronikov and others. Ovče Pole also has players who was emerged of it achieved a lot in their careers some of them: Gordan Zdravkov played in the Yugoslav First League with FK Vardar, participant in the UEFA Champions League and the international player, Robert Petrov the player of the North Macedonia national football team, Angel Efremov the goalkeeper of FK Vardar, Andreja Efremov the goalkeeper of FK Metalurg Skopje and FK Rabotnički and the player of the North Macedonia national under-21 football team and the others.

In the club into the past he worked a youth team that took care of future of the football in his city, but one of the most important benefits that any and Sveti Nikole experienced constant promotion through the football club Ovče Pole.

Supporters
The Ovče Pole supporters are called Ovčari.

Current squad

References

External links
Official website 
Ovče Pole Facebook 
Club info at MacedonianFootball 
Football Federation of Macedonia 

Football clubs in North Macedonia
Association football clubs established in 1925
1925 establishments in Yugoslavia
FK